Sebaceous lymphadenoma is a benign tumour of the salivary gland.

Diagnosis
Sebaceous lymphadenoma is a tissue diagnosis, e.g. salivary gland biopsy.

It may be confused with a number of benign and malignant neoplasms, including Warthin tumour, mucoepidermoid carcinoma and sebaceous lymphadenocarcinoma.

Treatment
The treatment is simple excision and exclusion of a malignant neoplasm.

See also
 Lymph node
 Lymphoma
 Salivary gland neoplasm

References

Lymphatic organ diseases